A list of films produced in the Tollywood Telugu language film industry split by year of release in the 2010s.

 List of Telugu films of 2010
 List of Telugu films of 2011
 List of Telugu films of 2012
 List of Telugu films of 2013
 List of Telugu films of 2014
 List of Telugu films of 2015
 List of Telugu films of 2016
 List of Telugu films of 2017
 List of Telugu films of 2018
 List of Telugu films of 2019

See also
Lists of Telugu-language films



Telugu
Telugu films